Gol Anbar (also Romanized as Gol ‘Anbar; also known as Galanbar, Gol Anbareh, Kalanbar, Kolambar, Kolanbar, Kuliambar, and Kyulyambar) is a village in Ozomdel-e Jonubi Rural District, in the Central District of Varzaqan County, East Azerbaijan Province, Iran. At the 2006 census, its population was 214, in 41 families.

References 

Towns and villages in Varzaqan County